The AHA Tournament is the conference tournament for the Atlantic Hockey Association.  The winner of the tournament receives an automatic berth into the NCAA Tournament.

The tournament was first held in 2004 after the cessation of the MAAC men's ice hockey tournament, the first year of conference play. The final four games were held at Tate Rink in West Point, New York in 2004. The tournament championship moved to the Northford Ice Pavilion in Northford, Connecticut for 2005 then to the Hart Center in Worcester, Massachusetts for 2006. Starting with the 2007 tournament, the final four was moved to a neutral site, the Blue Cross Arena in Rochester, New York, the home of the AHL's Rochester Americans.

AHA Men's Ice Hockey Tournament champions

Championships by season

Formats
 2004-2005
The AHA Tournament format begins as a single-game elimination three-round format, with an additional play-in game for the teams the finished eighth and ninth.

 2006
After Quinnipiac leaves to join the ECAC, the 8-team conference drops the play-in game from the tournament.

 2007
With Air Force and RIT joining the conference, but with RIT's ineligibility for the conference tournament, a play-in game was added for one year.

 2008
The opening round becomes a best-of-three with 5 separate series played between all ten of the conference teams with the two remaining lowest-seeded teams playing in a final-five game to determine the last semifinalist. All series after the opening round are single-elimination.

 2009-2010
The four lowest-seeded teams play two play-in games to determine the final two qualifiers for the quarterfinals.

 2011
With Niagara and Robert Morris joining the conference, the tournament was expanded to have four rounds. The tournament competitors were split into two groups: 'East' and 'West', and each group was arranged to play so that the top two finishers for each group received a bye into the quarterfinals while the remaining four teams in each group played single-elimination games to advance to the quarterfinals. The quarterfinals remained a best-of-three format while the final four stayed as single-elimination games.

 2012-2013
The 'East' and 'West' groupings are dropped and the opening round becomes a best-of-three series with the top four finishers receiving byes into the quarterfinals.

Championship appearances

By school

By coach

MAAC

The MAAC founded its hockey sponsorship starting in 1997 due to NCAA regulations that required all Division I conferences to participate in all Division sports. At the founding of the MAAC hockey conference, only three of the eight founding teams were full members of the conference (Canisius, Fairfield, Iona). The MAAC began play starting with the 1998-99 season and quickly added two additional teams (Mercyhurst and Bentley) the following year. Army joined the conference for the 2000-01 season, bringing the conference up to eleven member teams. At the conclusion of the 2002-03 season Fairfield and Iona both discontinued their men's ice hockey programs, and while the conference's remaining nine teams could continue without them, having only one full member necessitated the folding of the MAAC hockey conference as the eight associate members had no vote for the legislation the conference passed. The following year all of the teams continued their programs in the newly formed Atlantic Hockey conference.

References